Sony Channel (formerly Sony Entertainment Television) was a Southeast Asian pay television channel broadcasting to Hong Kong and Southeast Asia, owned by Sony Pictures Entertainment. It was launched on 1 August 2008 as an entertainment channel, and adopted its current name on 15 October 2014.

As a part of a plan to relaunch BeTV as Gem, all non-Asian programmes on BeTV were moved to Sony Channel, effective 15 October 2014.

After more than ten years of broadcast, Sony Channel ceased broadcast of across Asia including Malaysia, Philippines, Hong Kong and Singapore 
is on 1 June 2019 at midnight while in Indonesia and Thailand the channel will be also ceased a day earlier. The channel programmed with the final episode of Superstore on that day, an ending with the season four finale encore "Employee Appreciation Day" as one of the last express from the U. S. telecast including full season binge before going off-the-air while a final farewell on-screen message card and the words "Sony Channel has ceased broadcasting in Asia. We thank you for continual support." Most of the favourite programs of Sony Channel will also be shown on AXN. On Cignal in the Philippines, its EPG slot was given to Blue Ant Entertainment.

Feeds 
 Main feed: distributed on Malaysia, Singapore, Maldives, Hong Kong, Thailand, Sri Lanka and Indonesia, with an additional HD simulcast feed available.
 Philippines feed: branched from the Main feed; shares schedule with additional shows from AXN and local advertisement.

Final Programming

Drama
 The Art of More
 Body of Proof
 The Borgias
 Chasing Life (Season 1)
 Chicago Justice
 Chicago Med
 Code Black
 Conviction
 Damages
 Desperate Housewives
 Drop Dead Diva
 Ghost Whisperer
 Gone 
 Grey's Anatomy (Seasons 8 and 10)
 Hidden Palms
 How to Get Away with Murder
 Jane the Virgin
 Justified (Seasons 5 and 6)
 Law & Order True Crime
 Madam Secretary (Season 1 to 5)
 Monster Man
 Nashville (Seasons 1 and 2)
 Necessary Roughness
 The Night Shift (Seasons 1 to 4)
 Satisfaction
 Scandal (Season 1 and 3)
 Sherlock (Seasons 1 and 2)
 State of Affairs
 Sweet Home Alabama
 Teen Wolf (Seasons 1 and 6)
 Touched by an Angel (Seasons 6 to 9)
 The Whispers

Comedy
 Baby Daddy
 Bad Judge
 Better Late Than Never
 The Carmichael Show
 Casual
 Crowded
 Dr. Ken
 Everybody Loves Raymond
 Girlfriends' Guide to Divorce
 Great News
 Manhattan Love Story
 Marlon
 Men at Work
 Odd Mom Out
 Playing House (Seasons 1 to 3)
 Rob
 Sex and the City
 Spy 
 Superstore (Season 1 to 4)
 Truth Be Told
 Younger

Reality/Game Show
 Adventure Your Way
 American Idol (Season 17)
 The Apartment - Passion For Design (Season 6)
 The Apartment - Rising Stars (Season 5)
 Asia's Got Talent (Season 1)
 Breaking the Magician's Code
 Cupcake Wars (Seasons 1 to 4)
 Cyril: Simply Magic
 Cyril's Family Vacation: Hawaii Edition
 Cyril's Rio Magic
 Cyrus vs. Cyrus: Design and Conquer
 Face Off (Seasons 1 to 4)
 Fashion Hunters
 Flipping Out
 Hollywood Unzipped: Stylist Wars
 Hair Battle Spectacular
 Love Broker
 Making You Laugh Out Loud
 Masters of Illusion
 Million Dollar Matchmaker
 Millionaire Matchmaker
 Minute to Win It
 Minute to Win It - Australia
 Minute to Win It - U. K.
 Monica the Medium
 Nail'd It!
 Pregnant in Heels
 The Rachel Zoe Project
 The Real Housewives of New York City (Season 6)
 Stars in Style
 Style by Jury
 Top 20 Funniest (Seasons 1 and 2)
 Top Chef (Seasons 1 to 13)
 Top Chef Duels (Seasons 1 and 2)
 Top Chef Just Desserts
 Top Chef Masters
 The Voice (Seasons 3 and 9)
 Worst Cooks in America (Seasons 2 to 5)

News Magazine and Lifestyle
 E BUZZ
 Sony Style TV Magazine
 Sweet Julia with Julia Baker

Movie Block
 Sony Channel Movie Flicks

External links
 

Sony Pictures Television
Defunct television channels
Sony Pictures Entertainment
Television channels and stations established in 2014
Television channels and stations disestablished in 2019
Women's interest channels
Mass media in Southeast Asia